Heinrich Conrad Weinkauff (1817–1886) was a German zoologist and malacologist. Weinkauff described many new species.

Works 
Partial list
Weinkauff H. C., 1867-1868: Die Conchylien des Mittelmeeres, ihre geographische und geologisches Verbreitung; T. Fischer, Cassel, Vol. 1: pp. XIX + 307 [1867]. Vol. 2: pp. VI + 512. [1868] pdf
Weinkauff, H.C., 1872. Ein Streiflicht aus unsere Kenntniss der geographischen verbreitung des Meeres-mollusken. Nachr. Deutsch. Malak. Ges., 2: 33-43.
Weinkauff, H.C. 1874. Catalog der bis bekannt gewordenen Arten der Gattung Conus L. Jahrbücher der Deutschen Malakozoologischen Gesellschaft 1: 236-268, 273-305
Weinkauff, H.C. 1875. Conus. pp. 311–316 in Küster, H.C., Martini, F.W. & Chemnitz, J.H. (eds). Systematisches Conchylien-Cabinet von Martini und Chemnitz. Nürnberg : Bauer & Raspe Vol. 4.
Weinkauff, H.C. 1876. Das Genus Pleurotoma. pp. 49–136 in Küster, H.C., Martini, F.W. & Chemnitz, J.H. (eds). Systematisches Conchylien-Cabinet von Martini und Chemnitz. Nürnberg : Bauer & Raspe Vol. 4.
Weinkauff H.C., 1878 Die Gattung Oliva Systematisches Conchylien Cabinet von Martini und Chemnitz, Vol. 5 Abt. 1). Bauer & Raspe, Nürnberg

Note Conchylien-Cabinet von Martini und Chemnitz is  an enormous work published from 1837 up to 1920 with nearly one hundred sections, including some 4000 plates. The original work was continued by Heinrich Carl Küster and then Wilhelm Kobelt and Weinkauff.

References
Annex 2: Collation of the Systematisches Conchylien-Cabinet (1837-1920)

19th-century German zoologists
1886 deaths
1817 births
German malacologists